Bad Moon Rising (2004) is an original novel written by David Bishop and based on the long-running British science fiction comic strip Judge Dredd. It is Bishop's fourth Judge Dredd novel.

Synopsis
A massive riot engulfs Sector 87. Each chapter of the book depicts one hour in a day of mayhem.

External links
Bad Moon Rising at the 2000 AD website.

References

Novels by David Bishop
Judge Dredd novels